Dragomir Zakov (born 24 July 1975) is a Bulgarian politician and diplomat, serving as Minister of Defense in the Petkov Government since 1 March 2022. He served as head of the Permanent Delegation of the Republic of Bulgaria to NATO from 25 March 2019 to 1 March 2022.

Personal life and education 
Zakov was born on 24 July 1975 in Sofia. He completed his secondary education at the 9th French Language School "Alphonse de Lamartine". He went on to complete a Bachelor of International Economic Relations in 1998 and a Master of International Business in 1999 from the University of National and World Economy.

He is married and has 2 children. He can speak 4 languages; Bulgarian, French, Russian and English.

Diplomatic career 
Zakov served in the NATO Attaché from March 2002 to February 2004. In the same year he became the third secretary of the permanent delegation of Bulgaria to NATO.

In 2008 he held the position of Second Secretary in the Directorate of the Ministry of Foreign Affairs, responsible for policy and security and the Organization for Security and Cooperation in Europe.

In the period of 2011 to 2014 he was the first secretary of the Bulgarian delegation to the United Nations. In the next two years he was an advisor and head of various departments of the Ministry of Foreign Affairs. Between 2015 and 2016 he specialized at the European Security and Defense College. In August 2016, he returned to NATO as an advisor. In February 2017, he again took a role in the Ministry of Foreign Affairs, with the rank of Minister Plenipotentiary.

He served as head of the Permanent Delegation of the Republic of Bulgaria to NATO from 25 March 2019 to 1 March 2022.

Political career 
Zakov was proposed by prime minister Kiril Petkov on 1 March 2022 to succeed Stefan Yanev. He was approved as Minister of Defense by the 47th National Assembly, with the support of 184 members of the 240-seat parliament, no votes against and 33 abstentions.

Solomon Passy, the former foreign minister, praised the appointment and said that, "​​Zakov is the right man for the chair of military minister." He added, “I think this is one of the finest diplomats that can be selected for this job, and I think that his coming from NATO to take over the MoD is very significant, very crucial. I congratulate the Prime Minister for the extremely good choice.“

Honours and awards 

 Silver medal of honour of the Minister of Foreign Affairs of Bulgaria

 Certificate awarded by the US Army in recognition for the support to Operation Joint Guardian in Kosovo

References 

1975 births
Living people
Bulgarian politicians
Government ministers of Bulgaria
Politicians from Sofia
Diplomats from Sofia
Defence ministers of Bulgaria
University of National and World Economy alumni